Manuel Luis Gonzales del Carmen (born August 19, 1967),  known professionally as Louie del Carmen, is an American animator, storyboard artist, director, and illustrator. Born in Cavite City, Philippines, he began work in the mid-1990s on animated series like Rugrats, Rocket Power, Invader Zim, The Grim Adventures of Billy and Mandy, Kim Possible, and The Mighty B!. During the summer of 2007 he began working as a story artist at DreamWorks Animation on some of their notable and successful projects like Kung Fu Panda, How to Train Your Dragon and The Croods.

In 2006, he self-published his first book titled Random Anomalies, a collection of editorial-style cartoons dealing with the subject of fate and synchronicity. Honoring his art heroes, he followed Random Anomalies with the science fiction themed art book The Wayward Traveller: Snapshots from Alternate Worlds. In The Wayward Traveller he cites such artists as Jean Giraud (Moebius), Syd Mead, and Katsuhiro Otomo as strong influences in his work. As a follow-up to The Wayward Traveller he released Alternating Currents in the summer of 2008, featuring an all new line up of science fiction illustrations.

Staying in sci-fi genre, del Carmen released his first self-published comic book in 2007 called Steel Noodles: A Slice of Heaven featuring an orange-haired, waif warrior named Val. The short, independently printed book served as a preview to a much larger story which he has developed into a multi-part graphic novel, starting with Steel Noodles Number 1 which debuted at the San Diego Comic-Con in July 2010.

He is currently a story supervisor/artist at Sony Pictures Animation in Culver City, California.

Del Carmen also has two brothers that work in animation; Ronnie is a story artist, designer, illustrator and film director at Pixar, while Rick (Enrique) works as a storyboard artist and assistant director at 20th Century Animation.

Filmography

Television

Feature film

Web/internet

Bibliography 
Rugrats: Pizza Cats  (1999 - ) Simon & Schuster
Rugrats: Oh Brother!  (1999 - ) Simon & Schuster
Rugrats: Be My Valentine (2000 - ) Simon & Schuster
Random Anomalies (2006) self-published
The Wayward Traveller: Snapshots from Alternate Worlds (2006) self-published
The Call (2007) (Hot Mexican Love Comics) (Independently published Anthology)
Subway Sketches (2007) (Art Compilation) (Imaginism Books, Toronto Canada)
Swallow 3 (2007) (Art Compilation) (IDW Publishing)
Dragon Sketches (2007) (Art Compilation) (Imaginism Books, Toronto Canada)
Steel Noodles: A Slice of Heaven (2007) self-published
Muerto Mambo (2008) (Hot Mexican Love Comics) (Independently published Anthology)
Alternating Currents (2008) self-published
DRAWING INSPIRATION: The Visual Artist at Work (2010) (Delmar Cengage Learning) 
Steel Noodles Number 1 (2010) self-published 
Girl n Robot: Boomtown (2011) self-published
Steel Noodles Number 2 (2012) self-published 
MUSE Volume 1 (2013) self-published

References

External links 
 Louie del Carmen website
 Artist Blog
 

American illustrators
American television directors
American storyboard artists
DreamWorks Animation people
Living people
1967 births
American people of Filipino descent
Sony Pictures Animation people